Tibro is a locality and the seat of Tibro Municipality in Västra Götaland County, Sweden with 8,018 inhabitants in 2010. Tibro has a long tradition of furniture production.

Sports
The following sports clubs are located in Tibro:

 Tibro AIK FK
 Tibro IBK

Notable people
Tibro is also the birthplace of:
 Robin Söderling, professional tennis player.
 Anton Stralman, professional NHL hockey player on the Tampa Bay Lightning.
 Viktoria Helgesson, a professional figure skater.
 Joshi Helgesson, a professional figure skater.
 Anders Eriksson seven-time world enduro champion.

References 

Municipal seats of Västra Götaland County
Swedish municipal seats
Populated places in Västra Götaland County
Populated places in Tibro Municipality